The 2021–22 Fifty50 Challenge was the second edition of the Fifty50 Challenge, a 50-over women's cricket competition played in Zimbabwe. The tournament took place in February and March 2022, with four teams competing in a double round-robin group stage.

Eagles won the competition, beating Rhinos in the final. The tournament was followed by the Women's T20 Cup.

Competition format
Teams played in a double round-robin in a group of four, therefore playing 6 matches overall. Matches were played using a one day format with 50 overs per side. The top two in the group advanced to the final.

The group worked on a points system with positions being based on the total points. Points were awarded as follows:

Win: 5 points. 
Tie: 3 points. 
Loss: 0 points.
Abandoned/No Result: 3 points.

Points table

 advanced to Final

Fixtures

Group stage

Final

Statistics

Most runs

Source: ESPN Cricinfo

Most wickets

Source: ESPN Cricinfo

References

External links
 Series home at ESPNcricinfo

Fifty50 Challenge
2022 in Zimbabwean cricket
Domestic cricket competitions in 2021–22